Coleophora conyzae is a moth of the family Coleophoridae. It is found from Sweden and Finland to the Iberian Peninsula, Corsica, Sicily and Crete and from Great Britain to Romania.

Description
The wingspan is 12–16 mm. The adults have streaked white and buff forewings. They are on wing in June and July.

The larvae feed on hemp-agrimony (Eupatorium cannabinum), ploughman's-spikenard (Inula conyza), Inula oculus-christi and common fleabane (Pulicaria dysenterica). They create a spatulate leaf case at the underside of the leaf. The case is 10–12 mm long, straight, brown, tubular, bivalved and sometimes hairy (depending on the host plant). The mouth angle is rather variable, but usually around 45°. The larvae make a new case after each moult. Full-grown larvae can be found at the end of May and in early June.

References

External links

conyzae
Moths described in 1868
Moths of Europe
Taxa named by Philipp Christoph Zeller